The 2018–19 Boston University Terriers women's basketball team represented Boston University during the 2018–19 NCAA Division I women's basketball season. The Terries were led by first year head coach Marisa Moseley, played their home games at Case Gym and were members of the Patriot League. They finished the season 15–14, 11–7 in Patriot League play to finish in fourth place. They lost in the quarterfinals of the Patriot League women's tournament to Holy Cross.

Roster

Schedule

|-
!colspan=9 style=| Non-conference regular season

|-
!colspan=9 style=| Patriot League regular season

|-
!colspan=9 style=| Patriot League Women's Tournament

See also
2018–19 Boston University Terriers men's basketball team

References

Boston University
Boston University Terriers women's basketball seasons